Fasu, also known as Namo Me, is one of the Kutubuan languages of New Guinea.

Varieties
Wurm and Hattori (1981) considered its three principal dialects, Fasu, Some and Namumi, to be three languages, which they called the West Kutubuan family. However, Glottolog and Usher consider Fasu to be a single language.

Classification
Fasu is not particularly close to the two East Kutubuan languages, though Usher reconfirms a connection.

Although Fasu has proto-TNG vocabulary, Malcolm Ross considers its traditional inclusion in TNG to be somewhat questionable. Other researchers agree.

Further reading
Loeweke, Eunice and Jean May. 1980. General Grammar of Fasu (Namo me): Lake Kutubu, Southern Highlands Province. In Don Hutchisson (ed.), Grammatical studies in Fasu and Mt. Koiali, 5–106. Workpapers in Papua New Guinea Languages, no. 27. Ukarumpa, Papua New Guinea: Summer Institute of Linguistics.

References

External links 
 Timothy Usher, New Guinea World, Namo Me

Languages of Gulf Province
Languages of Southern Highlands Province
Languages of Western Province (Papua New Guinea)
Kutubuan languages